The Sardinian regional election of 1989 took place on 11 June 1989.

One seat was canceled.

After the election a centre-left government composed of Christian Democracy, the Italian Socialist Party and the Italian Democratic Socialist Party was formed. The position of President of the Region was held by Mario Floris (1989–1991) and Antonello Cabras (1991–1994).

Results

Sources: Regional Council of Sardinia and Istituto Cattaneo

References

Elections in Sardinia
1989 elections in Italy
June 1989 events in Europe